Slow architecture is a term believed to have grown from the slow food movement of the mid-1980s. Slow architecture is generally architecture that is created gradually and organically, as opposed to building it quickly for short-term goals. It is often combined with an ecological, environmentally sustainable approach.

Slow architecture could also be interpreted literally to mean architecture that has taken a very long time to build, for example the Sagrada Família, in Barcelona.

When Eduardo Souto de Moura won the 2011 Pritzker Prize, a jury member described his buildings as slow architecture, because it required careful consideration to appreciate its intricacies. Professor Kenneth Frampton said "Souto de Moura's work is sort of more grounded in a way... They have their character coming from the way in which they have been developed as structures." 2012 Pritzker winner Wang Shu was described as "China's champion of Slow architecture".

Slow architecture examples

Canada
Professor John Brown of the University of Calgary has launched a not-for-profit website designed to promote "slow homes". This follows ten years of research. A slow home is described as attractive, in harmony with the neighbourhood, and energy efficient, using a smaller carbon footprint.

China
Pritzker Prize winning architect Wang Shu has been described as "China's champion of Slow architecture" His buildings evoke the densely packed architecture of China's older cities, with intimate courtyards, tilting walls and a variety of sloping roofs. "Cities today have become far too large. I’m really worried, because it’s happening too fast and we have already lost so much" he says.

Ireland
The slow architecture project in Ireland launched a touring exhibition by canal boat in 2010. The boat travelled between seven locations over a six-week period, with artists and architects holding workshops and lectures at each stopping point.

United States
In 2008, architects from leading US practices took part in a San Francisco-based project called Slow Food Nation. They created constructions that were generally food-related and ecologically motivated, including a variety of pavilions, a water station made from recycled bottles, a compost exhibit and a "soapbox" for farmers.

See also
Slow movement (culture)
Slow Food
Cittaslow (Slow Cities)
Slow photography

References

External links
 http://www.slow-architecture.com

Architectural styles
Architecture